Kaajee Singh is an Indian percussionist. In 2022, he is awarded Padma Shri by the Indian government for his contribution in Arts.

Early life
Singh is from Kalimpong.

Career
Singh began his career in 1952 with the Maaruni dance from. He took lessons in Shree Maadal from his father Indrajit Singh Sardar. In 1974, he went to Mumbai and worked with composers like Laxmikant-Pyarelal, Kalyanji-Anandji. He also invented the classical notations for Shree Mandal in 1974. In 1983, he came back to Kalimpong. He has written more than five books on instruments and folk music. He also runs the Sanskriti Sangrakshan Sansthan in Kalimpong.

Awards
Padma Shri

References

Recipients of the Padma Shri in arts
Indian male singers
Indian male dancers
1945 births
Living people